Chidambaram Sundaram Jayaraman or C. S. Jayaraman (Tamil: சி. எஸ். ஜெயராமன்) (January 6, 1917 – January 29, 1995) was a noted actor, music director and a successful playback singer, whose numerous songs were featured in many Tamil films from 1940s and 1960s.

Early life
Jayaraman hailed from the temple town Chidambaram and his father was the noted traditional Tamil music vocalist Sundaram Pillai. Jayaraman was a brother in law of M. Karunanidhi, then the chief minister of Tamil Nadu, India. It was through the courtesy of Jayaraman, who had solicited a movie-industry career to Karunanidhi as a good script writer to the senior script writer-cum-director Arul Soosai Arokiya Sami, popularly known as A. S. A. Sami.  M. Karunanidhi entered the Tamil movie world in 1947 in the A. S. A. Sami directed movie Rajakumari, which starred M. G. Ramachandran in the hero role.

Career life
Jayaraman was born on 6 January 1917. He had begun acting in Tamil movies in 1934. The names of movies he had starred in include Krishna Leela (1934), Bhakta Duruvan (1935), Nalla Thangaal (1935), Leelavathi Sulochana (1936), Izhantha Kaadhal (1941), Poompaavai (1944) and Krishna Bakthi (1948).

In addition, he was the sole music director for the Tamil movies Udayanan Vaasavathatha (1946) and Ratha Kanneer (1954). For two movies, Vijayakumari (1950) and Krishna Vijayam (1950), he functioned as a co-music director as well. Jayaraman's gifted tremolo voice and his enunciation of Tamil words had a mystic charm and grace, to the point that he had the title "Tamil Isai Chittar" (Tamil: தமிழ் இசை சித்தர்), which reads as Tamil Music Mystic. Jayaraman also had sung a number of songs in Kannada. One of his Kannada songs, from Bedara Kannappa starring Rajkumar, became a huge hit and is played even today.

Jayaraman is one of those singers who have performed full-fledged Tirukkural concerts.

Jayaraman died on 29 January 1995.

Discography

Citations

General references

Further reading

External links
 Three Gifted Voices of a Golden Era in My Movie Minutes

Indian male singers
Tamil musicians
Tamil playback singers
1995 deaths
Year of birth missing
People from Cuddalore district
Recipients of the Sangeet Natak Akademi Award